Three-time Emmy-winning writer Sheri Anderson is responsible for helming over 3000 hours of network television. She has been involved in every aspect of the writing process including long-term storyline, daily episode breakdowns, dialogue writing and editing, audition scenes and supervision of the writing staff, as well as having final say in casting.  She is recognized as one of the creative forces behind the high romance era of soap opera in the 1980s, the most popular in the genre's history.

Shows that Anderson helmed or co-head wrote include Days of Our Lives, General Hospital, Santa Barbara, Guiding Light, Another World and primetime's Falcon Crest.  During that time, she developed two spinoffs for Days of our Lives. She also served as Executive Producer for the first original content program on the web, The Spot, and also developed numerous TV and film projects domestically for Spelling Entertainment, NBC, Sony Interactive and Nelvana, and internationally with Bavaria Films (Germany), Spectak (Australia) and Franz Marx Films/MNET (South Africa). Through an actress she cast on Days of our Lives, Sheri met highly respected talent manager, Paul Cohen and they soon joined forces. Their company, The Partnership is based in Hollywood and represents actors in film and television.

Sheri resides in Los Angeles with her husband, Paca Thomas, five-time Emmy-winning sound designer, producer and owner of media arts company pacaworks.com.

References

External links

American soap opera writers
American television producers
American women television producers
Women soap opera writers
Living people
Year of birth missing (living people)
Place of birth missing (living people)
21st-century American women